The MAN Turbo 6022 (also BMW 6022/MTU 6022) is a German gas turbine turboshaft engine for helicopter use. Designed in the early 1960s by BMW the engine powered the third prototype of the MBB Bo 105 on its maiden flight in December 1967.

Variants
6022-A1
Base variant.  at 6,000 rpm.

6022-A2 
 at 6,000 rpm. Powered the third prototype Bo 105. Passed 100 hour type test in 1968.

6022-A3
 at 6,000 rpm. Production engines for Bo 105 with strengthened reduction gear.

Applications
 Dornier Aerodyne
 MBB Bo 105 (third prototype)

Engines on display
Hubschraubermuseum Bückeburg

Specifications (6022-A3)

See also

References

1960s turboshaft engines